Robert Wrenn defeated Fred Hovey in the all comers final, 6–4, 3–6, 6–4, 6–4 to win the men's singles tennis title at the 1893 U.S. National Championships. Three-time reigning champion Oliver Campbell did not defend his title.

Draw

Challenge round

Finals

Earlier rounds

Section 1

Section 2

Section 3

Section 4

Section 5

Section 6

Section 7

Section 8

References 
 

\

Men's singles
1893